James Kirkwood (24 November 1930 – 4 November 1970) was an Australian sports shooter. He competed in the 50 metre rifle, prone event at the 1964 Summer Olympics.

References

1930 births
1970 deaths
Australian male sport shooters
Olympic shooters of Australia
Shooters at the 1964 Summer Olympics
Place of birth missing
20th-century Australian people